The 2018–19 FC Rubin Kazan season was the sixteenth successive season that Rubin Kazan played in the Russian Premier League, the highest tier of association football in Russia.

Season events

Squad

Transfers

In:

Out:

Winter

In:

Out:

Competitions

Russian Premier League

Results by round

Results

League table

Russian Cup

Squad statistics

Appearances and goals

|-
|colspan="14"|Players away from the club on loan:
|-
|colspan="14"|Players who left Rubin Kazan during the season:

|}

Goal scorers

Disciplinary record

References

External links

FC Rubin Kazan seasons
Rubin Kazan